The 2010 New Mexico State Aggies football team represented New Mexico State University in the 2010 NCAA Division I FBS college football season. The Aggies were led by second-year head coach DeWayne Walker. They played their home games at Aggie Memorial Stadium and were affiliated with the Western Athletic Conference. They finished the season 2–10, 1–7 in WAC play.

Schedule

NFL draft

 Davon House, 4th Round, 131 Overall Pick by the Green Bay Packers

References

New Mexico State
New Mexico State Aggies football seasons
New Mexico State Aggies football